Inspiral Carpets is the fifth studio album by the British indie rock band of the same name, released on 20 October 2014. The album is their first in 20 years; and the first full-length album in the band's history to feature founding vocalist Stephen Holt, who replaced Tom Hingley following Hingley's departure from the band. It is also the band's final album with drummer Craig Gill, before his death in 2016.

It was announced in January 2014 on the official Inspiral Carpets web site. The track list was revealed in their July 2014 email newsletter. Despite initial announcements saying that both their non-album singles with Holt would be included, only "You're So Good for Me" made the final cut.

Track listing

Personnel
Clint Boon – keyboards, backing vocals
Craig Gill – drums
Stephen Holt – lead vocals
Graham Lambert – guitars
Martyn Walsh – bass

References 

2014 albums
Inspiral Carpets albums
Cherry Red Records albums